Keep the Home Guard Turning is a 1943 comedy novel by the British writer Compton Mackenzie. It portrays the activities of the Home Guard on a remote Scottish island during the Second World War. The characters and setting reappeared in the more famous sequel Whisky Galore in 1947.

The title is a play on the First World War song Keep the Home Fires Burning.

References

Bibliography
 David Joseph Dooley. Compton Mackenzie. Twayne Publishers, 1974.
 Andro Linklater. Compton Mackenzie: A Life Hogarth Press, 1992.

External links
 

1943 British novels
Novels by Compton Mackenzie
Novels set in the Outer Hebrides
British comedy novels
Chatto & Windus books